The Chief  is a British television crime drama series that aired on ITV from 20 April 1990 until 16 June 1995. A total of five series and thirty-five episodes were produced.

Overview
The series followed the work of the fictitious "Eastland Constabulary", particularly focusing on Chief Constable John Stafford (Tim Pigott-Smith), and his efforts to restore order within his volatile team. Later, focus shifted towards Stafford's replacement, Alan Cade (Martin Shaw). The series was produced by Anglia Television and was mostly filmed and set in East Anglia. The series was notable for a lot of political content, in particular for Stafford's battles with the Home Office and local politicians. John Alderson (police officer), a former Chief Constable of the Devon and Cornwall Police, was an adviser on the show, allowing it to be portrayed as reflecting real life.

Cast
 Tim Pigott-Smith as Chief Constable John Stafford (Series 1–3)
 Martin Shaw as Chief Constable Alan Cade (Series 3–5)
 Karen Archer as Assistant Chief Constable / Acting Deputy Chief Constable Anne Stewart (Series 1–4)
 Eamon Boland as Detective Chief Superintendent Jim Gray (Series 1–3)
 Stuart McGugan as Detective Superintendent / Detective Chief Superintendent / Acting Assistant Chief Constable Sean McCloud (Series 3–4)
 Gillian Bevan as Detective Superintendent Rose Penfold (Series 5)
 Tony Caunter as Deputy Chief Constable Arthur Quine (Series 1–2)
 Bosco Hogan as Deputy Chief Constable Wes Morton (Series 5)
 Dean Lepley as PC Jack Sayers (Series 1–5)
 Brian Bovell as PC Charlie Webb (Series 5)
 Michael Cochrane as Nigel Crimmond (Series 1–5)
 Gillian Martell as Diane Lewis (Series 2–5)
 Judy Loe as Dr. Elizabeth Stafford (Series 1–3)
 Ross Livingstone as Tim Stafford (Series 1–2)
 T. P. McKenna as Colin Fowler (Series 2–4)
 Julian Glover as Andrew Blake (Series 5)

Series overview

There series has been released in Australia (Region 4).
Series 1 & Series 2 on 5 March 2014.
Series 3 & Series 4 on 7 May 2014.
Series 5 on 9 July 2014.
The Chief Collection on 7 March 2018.

Home media
A behind-the-scenes book, entitled On Duty with The Chief, written by Peter Haining, was published on 31 January 1995 to tie in with the broadcast of the fifth and final series. In 2010, Network began realising The Chief on Region 2 DVD, with a "12" certificate. The content has not been modified from the original broadcasts, and every episode contains the title cards for the commercial breaks. There are no special features.

Episodes

Series 1 (1990)

Series 2 (1991)

Series 3 (1993)

Series 4 (1994)

Series 5 (1995)

References

External links
.

1990s British drama television series
1990 British television series debuts
1995 British television series endings
1990s British crime television series
ITV television dramas
Television series by ITV Studios
Television shows produced by Anglia Television
English-language television shows
Television shows set in Norfolk